Meza may refer to:

People 
, Belgian rapper
Abinadi Meza (born 1977), American artist
Andrea Meza (born 1994), Mexican model, beauty pageant titleholder, and Miss Universe 2020 winner
Arturo Meza (born 1956), Mexican songwriter, musician, composer, singer, poet, and writer
Christian Julius de Meza, commander of the Danish army during the 1864 Second Schleswig War
Enrique Meza (born 1948), Mexican football coach
Enrique Maximiliano Meza (born 1979), Mexican football coach
Florinda Meza (born 1949), Mexican television and film actress
Guillermo Meza (artist) (1917 - 1997), a Mexican artist
Guillermo Meza (footballer) (1988–2010), a Mexican football player
José Luis Oliva Meza, former mayor of Veracruz, Mexico
Juan Meza (born 1956), boxer
Juan N. Silva Meza (born 1944), Mexican jurist
, Peruan composer
Miguel de San Román Meza (1802–1863), President of Peru between 1862 and 1863
Pablo José Meza,  Argentinian producer, film director, and screenplay writer
Severo Meza (born 1986), football player

Other uses 
Meza (butterfly), a genus of grass skipper butterflies
Meza (rural locality), several rural localities in Kostroma Oblast, Russia
Meža, a river in Carinthia, Slovenia

See also
Mesa (disambiguation)
Capitán Meza, a town and a district in the Itapúa department of Paraguay
Meze, a selection of small dishes served as appetizers in much of West Asia, Middle East and the Balkans